Mario Tirelli (born 1906, date of death unknown) was an Italian entomologist.

Tirelli was a specialist in the anatomy and  biology of Bombyx mori the Mulberry silkmoth. He was under director of the Stazione Bacologica Sperimentale in Padua. He wrote Fisiologia degli Insetti (1929) and Atlante microfotografico della embriologia degli insetti (Bombyx mori). Col concorso della ditta G. Pasqualis di Vittorio Veneto, Padova, Regia Stazione Bacologica Sperimentale. (1930).

References
Osborn, H. 1946 Fragments of Entomological History Including Some Personal Recollections of Men and Events.  Columbus, Ohio, Published by the Author 2 1–232, 36 Taf. 149, Portr.(Taf. 22)
Osborn, H. 1952 A Brief History of Entomology Including Time of Demosthenes and Aristotle to Modern Times with over Five Hundred Portraits. Columbus, Ohio, The Spahr & Glenn Company : 1-303 229, Portr.

 

1906 births
Year of death missing
Italian entomologists